The following people have served as deans or acting deans of the Samuel Curtis Johnson Graduate School of Management at Cornell University.

Deans

Paul M. O'Leary (1946-1951)
Edward H. Litchfield (1954-1957)
C. Stewart Sheppard (1957-1962)
William D. Carmichael (1962-1970)
H. Justin Davidson (1970-1981)
Curtis W. Tarr (1983-1989)
Alan G. Merten (1989-1996)
Robert J. Swieringa (1997-2007)
L. Joseph Thomas (2007-2012)
Soumitra Dutta (2012-2016)
Mark W. Nelson (2016-)

Acting deans

Melvin G. deChazeau, Acting Dean (1952-1954)
David A. Thomas, Acting Dean (1981-1983)

References